Urgedra pavimenta is a moth of the family Notodontidae. It is found in central Colombia.

Taxonomy
Gaede treated it as a synonym of Urgedra striata in 1934, but it was resurrected to full species status in 2011.

References

Moths described in 1910
Notodontidae